The Milege World Music Festival or just Milege Festival is an annual music festival, happening every November, organized by Milege Afrojazz Band. The festival is a celebration of world music, games, cultural dances, stories, poems, and so on. Art pieces from the Repainting Uganda project are also displayed and sold during the festival. The festival invites many different world music stars from across Africa and sometimes from Asia, Europe, and America. The Milege World Music Festival of 2014 saw Japanese world star and world's first female nyatiti player Anyango perform.

Milege started the festival in 2010, moving across Uganda, but has since 2014 relocated it to the Botanical Gardens in Entebbe.

Organizers
The festival is normally organized by Milege band members, members of the Milege Acoustic Project, and well-wishers. Preparation for the festival starts as early as January.

List of Milege World Music Festivals

References

World music festivals
Tourism in Uganda
Music festivals in Uganda